Handog ni Guy Live is the first live album of singer-actress Nora Aunor. It was released in 1991 in the Philippines, under WEA. In celebration of its 20th anniversary, Universal Records re-issued Handog Ni Guy Live Album in 2011.

This album was recorded live from Aunor's first major concert at the Araneta Coliseum on May 18, 1991, a few days before her 38th birthday.  Her guests include Gary Valenciano, Mon Faustino, The Hotlegs, The Operas and many more.

Background

The album include the songs that made popular by Aunor in the Philippines, like People by Barbra Streisand and  "Handog" by Florante.  The album also includes Filipino Movie theme songs and Pinoy Rock and Roll Medly.

Track listing

1 (Yesterday When I was Young, The Music Played, Moonlight in Vermont, Three Good Reasons)
2 (Hiram and Maging Sino Ka Man)
3 (Estudyante Blues, Laki sa Layaw ( Jeproks),Paikot-ikot, Panahon na para Magsaya)  
4 (All By My Self, This is My Life Greatest Performance, I will Survive)
5 (Paano Kita Mapasasalamatan, Ikaw ang Superstar, Handog)

Musicians

Musical Director and Arrangements
 Mon Faustino

Second Keyboard
Ding Faustino

Drums
 Tek Faustino

Bass Guitar
Ed De Guzman

Lead Guitar
Mon Espia

Back-up Vocals
Judith Banal
Jo Ramos
The Opera
Manolo Tanquilot
Zebedee Zuniga
Sushi Reyes
Cecille Rojas

Saxophone and Ewi
Ike Dy Liacco

Percussions
Joseph Aranza

Audio Album Recording
Audio Captain Recording Studios

See also
Nora Aunor discography

References

Nora Aunor albums
1991 live albums